Cyrtodactylus kulenensis is a species of gecko that is endemic to Cambodia.

References

Cyrtodactylus
Reptiles described in 2021
Taxa named by Larry Lee Grismer
Taxa named by Peter Geissler
Taxa named by Thy Neang
Taxa named by Timo Hartmann
Taxa named by Philipp Wagner
Taxa named by Nikolay A. Poyarkov Jr.